Nərimanabad (also, Narimanov, Sara, and Sara-Ostrov) is a village and municipality in the Lankaran Rayon of Azerbaijan.  It has a population of 4,876.  The municipality consists of the villages of Nərimanabad and Üzümçülük.

References 

Populated places in Lankaran District